Parliamentary elections were held in Cape Verde on 13 January 1991, the country's first multi-party elections, having previously been a one-party state with the African Party for the Independence of Cape Verde (PAICV) as the sole legal party. The number of seats was reduced from 83 to 79. The result was a victory for the Movement for Democracy, which won 56 of the 79 seats. Voter turnout was 75.3%.

Results

References

Cape Verde
Elections in Cape Verde
1991 in Cape Verde
Cape Verde